El Niño–Southern Oscillation (ENSO) is an irregular periodic variation in winds and sea surface temperatures over the tropical eastern Pacific Ocean, affecting the climate of much of the tropics and subtropics. The warming phase of the sea temperature is known as El Niño and the cooling phase as La Niña. The Southern Oscillation is the accompanying atmospheric component, coupled with the sea temperature change: El Niño is accompanied by high air surface pressure in the tropical western Pacific and  La Niña with low air surface pressure there. The two periods last several months each and typically occur every few years with varying intensity per period.

The two phases relate to the Walker circulation, which was discovered by Gilbert Walker during the early twentieth century. The Walker circulation is caused by the pressure gradient force that results from a high-pressure area over the eastern Pacific Ocean, and a low-pressure system over Indonesia. Weakening or reversal of the Walker circulation (which includes the trade winds) decreases or eliminates the upwelling of cold deep sea water, thus creating El Niño by causing the ocean surface to reach above average temperatures. An especially strong Walker circulation causes La Niña, resulting in cooler ocean temperatures due to increased upwelling.

Mechanisms that cause the oscillation remain under study. The extremes of this climate pattern's oscillations cause extreme weather (such as floods and droughts) in many regions of the world. Developing countries dependent upon agriculture and fishing, particularly those bordering the Pacific Ocean, are the most affected.

Outline
The El Niño–Southern Oscillation is a single climate phenomenon that periodically fluctuates between three phases: Neutral, La Niña or El Niño. La Niña and El Niño are opposite phases which require certain changes to take place in both the ocean and the atmosphere before an event is declared.

Normally the northward flowing Humboldt Current brings relatively cold water from the Southern Ocean northwards along South America's west coast to the tropics, where it is enhanced by up-welling taking place along the coast of Peru. Along the equator, trade winds cause the ocean currents in the eastern Pacific to draw water from the deeper ocean to the surface, thus cooling the ocean surface. Under the influence of the equatorial trade winds, this cold water flows westwards along the equator where it is slowly heated by the sun. This warmer area of ocean is a source for convection and is associated with cloudiness and rainfall. During El Niño years the cold water weakens or disappears completely as the water in the Central and Eastern Pacific becomes as warm as the Western Pacific.

Walker circulation

The Walker circulation is caused by the pressure gradient force that results from a high pressure system over the eastern Pacific Ocean, and a low pressure system over Indonesia.  The Walker circulations of the tropical Indian, Pacific, and Atlantic basins result in westerly surface winds in northern summer in the first basin and easterly winds in the second and third basins.  As a result, the temperature structure of the three oceans display dramatic asymmetries.  The equatorial Pacific and Atlantic both have cool surface temperatures in northern summer in the east, while cooler surface temperatures prevail only in the western Indian Ocean.  These changes in surface temperature reflect changes in the depth of the thermocline.

Changes in the Walker circulation with time occur in conjunction with changes in surface temperature.  Some of these changes are forced externally, such as the seasonal shift of the sun into the Northern Hemisphere in summer.  Other changes appear to be the result of coupled ocean-atmosphere feedback in which, for example,  easterly winds cause the sea surface temperature to fall in the east, enhancing the zonal heat contrast and hence intensifying easterly winds across the basin. These anomalous easterlies induce more equatorial upwelling and raise the thermocline in the east, amplifying the initial cooling by the southerlies. This coupled ocean-atmosphere feedback was originally proposed by Bjerknes. From an oceanographic point of view, the equatorial cold tongue is caused by easterly winds. Were the Earth climate symmetric about the equator, cross-equatorial wind would vanish, and the cold tongue would be much weaker and have a very different zonal structure than is observed today.

During non-El Niño conditions, the Walker circulation is seen at the surface as easterly trade winds that move water and air warmed by the sun toward the west. This also creates ocean upwelling off the coasts of Peru and Ecuador and brings nutrient-rich cold water to the surface, increasing fishing stocks.  The western side of the equatorial Pacific is characterized by warm, wet, low-pressure weather as the collected moisture is dumped in the form of typhoons and thunderstorms. The ocean is some  higher in the western Pacific as the result of this motion.

Sea surface temperature oscillation

Within the National Oceanic and Atmospheric Administration in the United States, sea surface temperatures in the Niño 3.4 region, which stretches from the 120th to 170th meridians west longitude astride the equator five degrees of latitude on either side, are monitored. The most recent three-month average for the area is computed, and if the region is more than 0.5 °C (0.9 °F) above (or below) normal for that period, then an El Niño (or La Niña) is considered in progress. The United Kingdom's Met Office also uses a several month period to determine ENSO state. When this warming or cooling occurs for only seven to nine months, it is classified as El Niño/La Niña "conditions"; when it occurs for more than that period, it is classified as El Niño/La Niña "episodes".

Neutral phase

If the temperature variation from climatology is within 0.5 °C (0.9 °F), ENSO conditions are described as neutral. Neutral conditions are the transition between warm and cold phases of ENSO. Ocean temperatures (by definition), tropical precipitation, and wind patterns are near average conditions during this phase. Close to half of all years are within neutral periods. During the neutral ENSO phase, other climate anomalies/patterns such as the sign of the North Atlantic Oscillation or the Pacific–North American teleconnection pattern exert more influence.

Warm phase

When the Walker circulation weakens or reverses and the Hadley circulation strengthens an El Niño results, causing the ocean surface to be warmer than average, as upwelling of cold water occurs less or not at all offshore northwestern South America.  El Niño is associated with a band of warmer than average ocean water temperatures that periodically develops off the Pacific coast of South America.  El niño is Spanish for "the child boy", and the capitalized term El Niño refers to the Christ child, Jesus, because periodic warming in the Pacific near South America is usually noticed around Christmas.  It is a phase of 'El Niño–Southern Oscillation' (ENSO), which refers to variations in the temperature of the surface of the tropical eastern Pacific Ocean and in air surface pressure in the tropical western Pacific. The warm oceanic phase, El Niño, accompanies high air surface pressure in the western Pacific. Mechanisms that cause the oscillation remain under study.

Cold phase

An especially strong Walker circulation causes La Niña, resulting in cooler ocean temperatures in the central and eastern tropical Pacific Ocean due to increased upwelling. La Niña is a coupled ocean-atmosphere phenomenon that is the counterpart of El Niño as part of the broader El Niño Southern Oscillation climate pattern. The name La Niña originates from Spanish, meaning "the child girl", analogous to El Niño meaning "the child boy". During a period of La Niña the sea surface temperature across the equatorial eastern central Pacific will be lower than normal by 3–5 °C. In the United States, an appearance of La Niña happens for at least five months of La Niña conditions. However, each country and island nation has a different threshold for what constitutes a La Niña event, which is tailored to their specific interests. The Japan Meteorological Agency for example, declares that a La Niña event has started when the average five month sea surface temperature deviation for the NINO.3 region, is over 0.5 °C (0.90 °F) cooler for 6 consecutive months or longer.

Transitional phases
Transitional phases at the onset or departure of El Niño or La Niña can also be important factors on global weather by affecting teleconnections. Significant episodes, known as Trans-Niño, are measured by the Trans-Niño index (TNI). Examples of affected short-time climate in North America include precipitation in the Northwest US and intense tornado activity in the contiguous US.

Southern Oscillation

The Southern Oscillation is the atmospheric component of El Niño. This component is an oscillation in surface air pressure between the tropical eastern and the western Pacific Ocean waters. The strength of the Southern Oscillation is measured by the Southern Oscillation Index (SOI). The SOI is computed from fluctuations in the surface air pressure difference between Tahiti (in the Pacific) and Darwin, Australia (on the Indian Ocean).

 El Niño episodes have negative SOI, meaning there is lower pressure over Tahiti and higher pressure in Darwin.
 La Niña episodes have positive SOI, meaning there is higher pressure in Tahiti and lower in Darwin.

Low atmospheric pressure tends to occur over warm water and high pressure occurs over cold water, in part because of deep convection over the warm water. El Niño episodes are defined as sustained warming of the central and eastern tropical Pacific Ocean, thus resulting in a decrease in the strength of the Pacific trade winds, and a reduction in rainfall over eastern and northern Australia. La Niña episodes are defined as sustained cooling of the central and eastern tropical Pacific Ocean, thus resulting in an increase in the strength of the Pacific trade winds, and the opposite effects in Australia when compared to El Niño.

Although the Southern Oscillation Index has a long station record going back to the 1800s, its reliability is limited due to the presence of both Darwin and Tahiti well south of the Equator, resulting in the surface air pressure at both locations being less directly related to ENSO. To overcome this question, a new index was created, being named the Equatorial Southern Oscillation Index (EQSOI). To generate this index data, two new regions, centered on the Equator, were delimited to create a new index: The western one is located over Indonesia and the eastern one is located over equatorial Pacific, close to the South American coast. However, data on EQSOI goes back only to 1949.

Madden–Julian oscillation

The Madden–Julian oscillation, or (MJO), is the largest element of the intraseasonal (30- to 90-day) variability in the tropical atmosphere, and was discovered by Roland Madden and Paul Julian of the National Center for Atmospheric Research (NCAR) in 1971. It is a large-scale coupling between atmospheric circulation and tropical deep convection. This overall circulation pattern manifests itself in various ways, most clearly as anomalous rainfall. The wet phase of enhanced convection and precipitation is followed by a dry phase where thunderstorm activity is suppressed. Each cycle lasts approximately 30–60 days. Because of this pattern, The MJO is also known as the 30- to 60-day oscillation, 30- to 60-day wave, or intraseasonal oscillation.

There is strong year-to-year (interannual) variability in MJO activity, with long periods of strong activity followed by periods in which the oscillation is weak or absent. This interannual variability of the MJO is partly linked to the El Niño–Southern Oscillation (ENSO) cycle. In the Pacific, strong MJO activity is often observed 6 – 12 months prior to the onset of an El Niño episode, but is virtually absent during the maxima of some El Niño episodes, while MJO activity is typically greater during a La Niña episode.  Strong events in the Madden–Julian oscillation over a series of months in the western Pacific can speed the development of an El Niño or La Niña but usually do not in themselves lead to the onset of a warm or cold ENSO event.  However, observations suggest that the 1982–1983 El Niño developed rapidly during July 1982 in direct response to a Kelvin wave triggered by an MJO event during late May. Further, changes in the structure of the MJO with the seasonal cycle and ENSO might facilitate more substantial impacts of the MJO on ENSO. For example, the surface westerly winds associated with active MJO convection are stronger during advancement toward El Niño and the surface easterly winds associated with the suppressed convective phase are stronger during advancement toward La Nina.

Impacts

On precipitation

Developing countries dependent upon agriculture and fishing, particularly those bordering the Pacific Ocean, are the most affected by ENSO. The effects of El Niño in South America are direct and strong. An El Niño is associated with warm and very wet weather months in April–October along the coasts of northern Peru and Ecuador, causing major flooding whenever the event is strong or extreme. La Niña causes a drop in sea surface temperatures over Southeast Asia and heavy rains over Malaysia, the Philippines, and Indonesia.

To the north across Alaska, La Niña events lead to drier than normal conditions, while El Niño events do not have a correlation towards dry or wet conditions. During El Niño events, increased precipitation is expected in California due to a more southerly, zonal, storm track. During La Niña, increased precipitation is diverted into the Pacific Northwest due to a more northerly storm track. During La Niña events, the storm track shifts far enough northward to bring wetter than normal winter conditions (in the form of increased snowfall) to the Midwestern states, as well as hot and dry summers. During the El Niño portion of ENSO, increased precipitation falls along the Gulf coast and Southeast due to a stronger than normal, and more southerly, polar jet stream. 

In the late winter and spring during El Niño events, drier than average conditions can be expected in Hawaii. On Guam during El Niño years, dry season precipitation averages below normal. However, the threat of a tropical cyclone is over triple what is normal during El Niño years, so extreme shorter duration rainfall events are possible. On American Samoa during El Niño events, precipitation averages about 10 percent above normal, while La Niña events lead to precipitation amounts which average close to 10 percent below normal. ENSO is linked to rainfall over Puerto Rico.  During an El Niño, snowfall is greater than average across the southern Rockies and Sierra Nevada mountain range, and is well-below normal across the Upper Midwest and Great Lakes states.  During a La Niña, snowfall is above normal across the Pacific Northwest and western Great Lakes. In Western Asia, during the region’s November–April rainy season, it was discovered that in the El Niño phase there was increased precipitation, and in the La Niña phase there was a reduced amount of precipitation on average.

Although ENSO can dramatically affect precipitation, even severe droughts and rainstorms in ENSO areas are not always deadly. Scholar Mike Davis cites ENSO as responsible for droughts in India and China in the late nineteenth century, but argues that nations in these areas avoided devastating famine during these droughts with institutional preparation and organized relief efforts.

On Tehuantepecers

The synoptic condition for the Tehuantepecer, a violent mountain-gap wind in between the mountains of Mexico and Guatemala, is associated with high-pressure system forming in Sierra Madre of Mexico in the wake of an advancing cold front, which causes winds to accelerate through the Isthmus of Tehuantepec. Tehuantepecers primarily occur during the cold season months for the region in the wake of cold fronts, between October and February, with a summer maximum in July caused by the westward extension of the Azores-Bermuda high pressure system. Wind magnitude is greater during El Niño years than during La Niña years, due to the more frequent cold frontal incursions during El Niño winters. The wind's direction is from the north to north-northeast. It leads to a localized acceleration of the trade winds in the region, and can enhance thunderstorm activity when it interacts with the Intertropical Convergence Zone. The effects can last from a few hours to six days.

On global warming

El Niño events cause short-term (approximately 1 year in length) spikes in global average surface temperature while La Niña events cause short term cooling. Therefore, the relative frequency of El Niño compared to La Niña events can affect global temperature trends on decadal timescales. Over the last several decades, the number of El Niño events increased, and the number of La Niña events decreased, although observation of ENSO for much longer is needed to detect robust changes.

The studies of historical data show the recent El Niño variation is most likely linked to global warming. For example, one of the most recent results, even after subtracting the positive influence of decadal variation, is shown to be possibly present in the ENSO trend, the amplitude of the ENSO variability in the observed data still increases, by as much as 60% in the last 50 years.

Future trends in ENSO are uncertain as different models make different predictions. It may be that the observed phenomenon of more frequent and stronger El Niño events occurs only in the initial phase of the global warming, and then (e.g., after the lower layers of the ocean get warmer, as well), El Niño will become weaker. It may also be that the stabilizing and destabilizing forces influencing the phenomenon will eventually compensate for each other. More research is needed to provide a better answer to that question. The ENSO is considered to be a potential tipping element in Earth's climate and, under the global warming, can enhance or alternate regional climate extreme events through a strengthened teleconnection. For example, an increase in the frequency and magnitude of El Niño events have triggered warmer than usual temperatures over the Indian Ocean, by modulating the Walker circulation. This has resulted in a rapid warming of the Indian Ocean, and consequently a weakening of the Asian Monsoon.

On coral bleaching

Following the El Nino event in 1997 – 1998, the Pacific Marine Environmental Laboratory attributes the first large-scale coral bleaching event to the warming waters.

On hurricanes

Based on modeled and observed accumulated cyclone energy (ACE), El Niño years usually result in less active hurricane seasons in the Atlantic Ocean, but instead favor a shift of tropical cyclone activity in the Pacific Ocean, compared to La Niña years favoring above average hurricane development in the Atlantic and less so in the Pacific basin.

Diversity
The traditional ENSO (El Niño Southern Oscillation), also called Eastern Pacific (EP) ENSO, involves temperature anomalies in the eastern Pacific. However, in the 1990s and 2000s, nontraditional ENSO conditions were observed, in which the usual place of the temperature anomaly (Niño 1 and 2) is not affected, but an anomaly arises in the central Pacific (Niño 3.4). The phenomenon is called Central Pacific (CP) ENSO, "dateline" ENSO (because the anomaly arises near the dateline), or ENSO "Modoki" (Modoki is Japanese for "similar, but different"). There are flavors of ENSO additional to EP and CP types and some scientists argue that ENSO exists as a continuum often with hybrid types.

The effects of the CP ENSO are different from those of the traditional EP ENSO. The El Niño Modoki leads to more hurricanes more frequently making landfall in the Atlantic. La Niña Modoki leads to a rainfall increase over northwestern Australia and northern Murray–Darling basin, rather than over the east as in a conventional La Niña. Also, La Niña Modoki increases the frequency of cyclonic storms over Bay of Bengal, but decreases the occurrence of severe storms in the Indian Ocean.

The recent discovery of ENSO Modoki has some scientists believing it to be linked to global warming. However, comprehensive satellite data go back only to 1979. More research must be done to find the correlation and study past El Niño episodes.
More generally, there is no scientific consensus on how/if climate change might affect ENSO.

There is also a scientific debate on the very existence of this "new" ENSO. Indeed, a number of studies dispute the reality of this statistical distinction or its increasing occurrence, or both, either arguing the reliable record is too short to detect such a distinction, finding no distinction or trend using other statistical approaches, or that other types should be distinguished, such as standard and extreme ENSO. Following the asymmetric nature of the warm and cold phases of ENSO, some studies could not identify such distinctions for La Niña, both in observations and in the climate models, but some sources indicate that there is a variation on La Niña with cooler waters on central Pacific and average or warmer water temperatures on both eastern and western Pacific, also showing eastern Pacific Ocean currents going to the opposite direction compared to the currents in traditional La Niñas.

Paleoclimate records
Different modes of ENSO-like events have been registered in paleoclimatic archives, showing different triggering methods, feedbacks and environmental responses to the geological, atmospheric and oceanographic characteristics of the time. These paleorecords can be used to provide a qualitative basis for conservation practices.

See also 
 Recharge Oscillator
 Effects of the El Niño–Southern Oscillation in Australia

References

External links

ENSO Outlook: An alert system for the El Niño–Southern Oscillation at BoM
Current map of sea surface temperature anomalies in the Pacific Ocean
Southern Oscillation Diagnostic Discussion at CPC

Tropical meteorology
Physical oceanography
Natural history of the Americas
Natural history of Oceania
Effects of climate change
Regional climate effects
Weather hazards
Spanish words and phrases
 
Climate oscillations